Westmoreland is a primarily residential neighborhood located in Huntington, West Virginia, United States. While most of Huntington is in Cabell County, Westmoreland is the small portion of Huntington that lies in Wayne County.
Westmoreland is the westernmost neighborhood in Huntington, and like Huntington is situated along the Ohio River. The neighborhood is protected by the floodwall that was built after the disastrous Ohio River Flood of 1937. 
Westmoreland is served by Kellogg Grade School and Vinson Middle School, and by nearby Spring Valley High School. Police and fire protection, and other municipal services, are provided by the City of Huntington.

References 

Huntington, West Virginia
Wayne County, West Virginia